Homophobic slurs